Percy Parke Lewis (1885–1962) was an American architect.

Biography

Early life
He was born on August 12, 1885, in Pennsylvania.

Career
1930–1931: St. Alban's Episcopal Church located at 580 Hilgard in Westwood, Los Angeles, California. 
1930–1931: Fox Theater located at 961 Broxton Avenue in Westwood, which is listed as a Los Angeles Historic-Cultural Monument on the Westside.
1920: Desmond's (department store), Westwood Village, Los Angeles 
1935: Chateau Colline located at 10335 West Wilshire Boulevard in Los Angeles, and it was added to the National Register of Historic Places in 2002.
R.W. House in Los Angeles
Potter Hardware Company Store in Westwood, Los Angeles.

Personal life
He married Ruth Augusta Lewis in 1917 in Omaha, Nebraska. He died on February 9, 1962, in Los Angeles County, California.

References

1885 births
1962 deaths
Architects from Pennsylvania
Architects from Los Angeles
20th-century American architects